John Andrew Grush and Taylor Newton Stewart, known collectively as The Newton Brothers, are American film score composers, record producers, conductors, and multi-instrumentalists. Their works include scores for several films with director Mike Flanagan, having composed for every project of his since Oculus (2013), and various other films and television series.

They are not related.

Biography
Early on in their lives both Andy and Taylor were inspired to combine music and visuals and seek a career in film composition. They are both accomplished musicians and multi-instrumentalists who can play piano, guitar, bass, clarinet, flute, accordion, sax, harmonica, percussion, organ, kazoo and cello. Together they apprenticed under Hans Zimmer and co-scored with Danny Elfman on the Mike Flanagan thriller, Before I Wake.

The Newton Brothers have been scoring feature films together for over a decade, catching their big break scoring Tony Kaye's acclaimed drama, Detachment, which starred and was produced by Academy Award-winner Adrien Brody. In 2013 they began their work in horror films with Mike Flanaghan and Blumhouse Productions including Oculus, which The Irish Times said, "Andy and Taylor Newton's dynamic combination of simple melodic fragments, aleatory noise (broken glass, metal scrapes) and a solemn choir gradually inject the seriously spooky Oculus with nerve-shredding suspense and skin-crawling dread,"  and Ouija: Origin of Evil.  They have since gone on to score multiple horror genre projects for film and television.

Awards and nominations
2016 - BloodGuts UK Horror Awards, Nominated Best Soundtrack/Score for Ouija: Origin of Evil (2016)
2015 - Fangoria Chainsaw Awards, 2nd place Best Score for Oculus (2013)

Filmography

References

External links
Official Website

Year of birth missing (living people)
Living people
21st-century American composers
21st-century American male musicians
American film score composers
American male film score composers
American musical duos
American record producers
Male film score composers